The 2016–17 MSV Duisburg season was the 117th season in the club's football history. In 2016–17 the club played in the 3. Liga, the third tier of German football after being relegated.

Team

Transfers

In

Out

Friendlies

Results
Times from 29 July to 29 October 2016 and from 26 March to 20 May 2017 are UTC+2, from 30 October 2016 to 25 March 2017 UTC+1.

3. Liga

League table

Results summary

Result round by round

Matches

DFB-Pokal

Lower Rhine Cup

Statistics

Squad statistics

|}

Goals

Clean sheets

Disciplinary record

References

External links

German football clubs 2016–17 season
MSV Duisburg seasons